The Juno Award for "Dance Recording of the Year" has been awarded since 1990, as recognition each year for the best dance music recording by an artist from Canada. Due to the relatively single-oriented nature of the dance genre, the award is most commonly presented for an individual single or a remix, although it may also be presented for a full album.

At the Juno Awards of 2021, it was announced that a new category for Underground Dance Single of the Year will be created alongside the existing category, and presented for the first time at the Juno Awards of 2022.

Winners

Best Dance Recording (1990 – 2002)

Dance Recording of the Year (2003 - Present)

References 

Dance
Dance music awards